"Love Is a Bridge" is a song by Australian band Little River Band, released in April 1988 as the lead single from the group's tenth studio album, Monsoon. The song peaked at number 6 on the Australian Kent Music Report singles chart.
The video clip features accomplished Australian actor, Marcus Graham.

Track listing
Australian 7" (MCA Records	7-53291), U.S. 7" (MCA Records MCA-53291)
Side A. "Love Is a Bridge" - 4:03
Side B. "Inside Story" - 4:22

Charts

References 

1988 singles
1988 songs
Little River Band songs
Songs written by Glenn Shorrock
Song recordings produced by John Boylan (record producer)
MCA Records singles